Kseniya Hennadiyivna Pantelyeyeva (born 11 May 1994) is a Ukrainian fencer. She competed at the 2012 Summer Olympics in the Women's épée, but was defeated in the second round. She was team bronze medallist at the 2015 World Fencing Championships in Moscow.

Pantelyeyeva is a student at the Lviv State University of Physical Culture.

References

Ukrainian female épée fencers
1994 births
Living people
Sportspeople from Lviv
Olympic fencers of Ukraine
Fencers at the 2012 Summer Olympics
Fencers at the 2016 Summer Olympics
Universiade medalists in fencing
Universiade bronze medalists for Ukraine
Medalists at the 2013 Summer Universiade
Medalists at the 2017 Summer Universiade